Thomas "Tom" Fredrick Lawrence Lysons (November 20, 1934 – May 7, 1997) was a former provincial level politician from Alberta, Canada. He served as a member of the Legislative Assembly of Alberta from 1975 to 1986.

Political career
Lysons ran for a seat to the Alberta Legislature in the 1975 Alberta general election. He won the electoral district of Vermilion-Viking winning a hotly contested race to pick up the district for the governing Progressive Conservative party. He ran for a second term in office in the 1979 Alberta general election this time winning easily after significantly increasing his popular vote. Lysons would win his highest popular vote running for his final term in office in the 1982 Alberta general election. He retired from the legislature at dissolution in 1986.

Lysons died in 1997.

References

External links
Legislative Assembly of Alberta Members Listing

Progressive Conservative Association of Alberta MLAs
1934 births
1997 deaths